Todd Polglase, born 21 March 1981 is an Australian former professional rugby league footballer. He played for the Canterbury-Bankstown Bulldogs, South Sydney Rabbitohs and Newcastle Knights in the National Rugby League competition.

Early life
Polglase was born Cessnock and raised in Pelaw Main, New South Wales, Australia and played his junior rugby league for the Kurri Kurri Bulldogs.

Playing career
Polglase made his first grade debut for Canterbury against his boyhood club Newcastle in the 2002 NRL season.  Polglase mainly played reserve grade at his time with Canterbury before transferring to South Sydney.  Polglase played three seasons at Souths, two of those finished with the club coming last and earning the Wooden Spoon.  In 2007, Polglase signed with Newcastle and only managed to play one season for the club before retiring due to a recurring hamstring injury.

References

External links
 Bulldogs profile
 Polglase announces retirement

1981 births
Living people
Australian rugby league players
Canterbury-Bankstown Bulldogs players
Kurri Kurri Bulldogs players
Newcastle Knights players
Rugby league centres
Rugby league fullbacks
Rugby league players from Cessnock, New South Wales
Rugby league wingers
South Sydney Rabbitohs players